Penzance Heliport  is located  northeast of Penzance, Cornwall. The heliport hosts scheduled flights to the Isles of Scilly, with a connection to the railway network at Penzance railway station by a special bus service.

The first heliport was officially closed on 31 October 2012. A new heliport is now operational and is the base for a new helicopter service to the islands of Tresco and St Mary's, operated by Penzance Helicopters in conjunction with Sloane Helicopters.

History
Services started on 1 May 1964 when BEA Helicopters operated the first service between Penzance and the Isles of Scilly with a Sikorsky S-61. The construction of the heliport cost £88,000.

Due to the high costs of maintaining the service and falling passenger numbers, British International Helicopters ceased the operation of the helicopter route on 31 October 2012. The company announced that it intended to sell the heliport to a supermarket chain and relocate to another site in West Cornwall to raise funds, although no suitable alternative site was found in time to save the service.

In early April 2013, demolition work on the main terminal buildings began, and by September 2013, nothing remained of the former heliport, with a supermarket chain now dominating the site.

New heliport 
In 2016 plans were announced for a new helicopter service between Penzance and the Isles of Scilly, serving both St Mary's and Tresco. The proposals include building a new heliport on Jelbert Way, Penzance, near to the location of the old one. The planning application received the highest level of support Cornwall Council had ever received for a planning application.

Planning consent for the new heliport was first granted in a unanimous decision by Cornwall Council's Strategic Planning Committee in February 2017. The decision was later challenged by the Isles of Scilly Steamship Company in a judicial review. A petition against the Judicial Review gained more than 11,000 signatures and an amended planning application was submitted.

The amended application was granted planning consent in a second unanimous decision by Cornwall Council in August 2018.

The new heliport was built during 2018 and 2019, with services commencing in March 2020, flying to the islands of St Mary's and Tresco.

Airlines and destinations

Statistics

References

External links

Penzance Heliport
Information on scheduled flights to the Isles of Scilly

Airports in Cornwall
Heliports in England
Buildings and structures in Penzance